The Phuwua rock agama (Mantheyus phuwuanensis) is a species of lizard within the family Agamidae. Mantheyus phuwuanensis is the only species in the genus Mantheyus. The species is endemic to Southeast Asia

Etymology
The generic name, Mantheyus, is in honor of German herpetologist Ulrich Manthey (born 1946).

Geographic range
M. phuwuanensis is found in west-central Laos and northeastern Thailand.

Reproduction
M. phuwuanensis is oviparous.

References

Further reading
Ananjeva, Natalia B.; Stuart, Bryan L. (2001). "The Agamid Lizard Ptyctolaemus phuwuanensis Manthey and Nabhitabhata, 1991 from Thailand and Laos Represents a New Genus". Russian Journal of Herpetology 8 (3): 165-170. (Mantheyus, new genus; Mantheyus phuwuanensis, new combination).
Manthey, Ulrich; Nabhitabhata, Jarujin (1991). "Eine neue Agame, Ptyctolaemus phuwuanensis sp. n. (Sauria Agamidae), aus Nordost-Thailand ". Sauria, Berlin 13 (4): 3-6. (Ptyctolaemus phuwuanensis, new species). (in German and Latin, with an abstract in English).

Agamidae
Reptiles described in 1991
Taxa named by Ulrich Manthey